This is a list of official symbols of the U.S. state of Louisiana. Official symbols of Louisiana are codified in the laws of Louisiana.

State symbols

State oath
State pledge :

I pledge allegiance to the flag of the state of Louisiana and to the motto for which it stands: A state, under God, united in purpose and ideals, confident that justice shall prevail for all of those abiding here.

LL 167, 1981

State poems

State judicial poem, written by Sylvia Davidson Lott Buckley, and entitled, "America, We The People":

LL 155.4, 1995

State Senate poem, written by Jean McGivney Boese and entitled "Leadership":

LL 155.5, 1999

See also
List of Louisiana-related topics
Louisiana flag
Lists of United States state insignia
State of Louisiana
Fleur-de-lis

References

External links 
Official State of Louisiana website
History and Culture of Louisiana
Louisiana State Government

State symbols
Louisiana